The 1938 All-Big Ten Conference football team consists of American football players selected to the All-Big Ten Conference teams selected by the Associated Press (AP) and United Press (UP) for the 1938 Big Ten Conference football season.

All Big-Ten selections

Ends
 Cleo Diehl, Northwestern (AP-1, UP-1)
 Erwin Prasse, Iowa (AP-1)
 Frank Petrick, Indiana (UP-1)
 George A. Nash, Minnesota (AP-2)
 John Mariucci, Minnesota (AP-2)

Tackles
 Joe Mihal, Purdue (AP-1, UP-1)
 Bob Voigts, Northwestern (AP-2, UP-1)
 Bob Haak, Indiana (AP-1)
 Alex Schoenbaum, Ohio State (AP-2)

Guards
 Ralph Heikkinen, Michigan (AP-1, UP-1)
 Francis Twedell, Minnesota (AP-1)
 Lynn Hovland, Wisconsin (AP-2)
 Hal Method, Northwestern (AP-2)

Centers
 Jack Murray, Wisconsin (AP-1, UP-1)
 John Haman, Northwestern (AP-2)

Quarterbacks
 Forest Evashevski, Michigan (AP-1)
 Wilbur Moore, Minnesota (AP-2 [halfback], UP-1)
 Vince Gavre, Wisconsin (AP-2)

Halfbacks
 Lou Brock, Purdue (AP-1, UP-1)
 Tom Harmon, Michigan (AP-1, UP-1)
 Roy Bellin, Wisconsin (AP-2)

Fullbacks
 Howard Weiss, Wisconsin (AP-1, UP-1)
 Larry Buhler, Minnesota (AP-2)

Key

AP = Associated Press, chosen by conference coaches

UP = United Press, based on a poll of Big Ten coaches, campus observers, and sports writers

Bold = Consensus first-team selection of both the AP and UP

See also
1938 College Football All-America Team

References

1938 Big Ten Conference football season
All-Big Ten Conference football teams